Ali Yerlikaya (born 11 October 1968) is a Turkish bureaucrat who has served as the Governor of Istanbul since 26 October 2018. Following the annulment of the March 2019 Istanbul mayoral election, Yerlikaya briefly served as the acting Mayor of Istanbul until a new successor was elected in a re-run in June 2019. 

Prior to becoming Governor of Istanbul, Yerlikaya previously served as the Governor of Şırnak from 2007 to 2010, as the Governor of Ağrı from 2010 to 2012, as the Governor of Tekirdağ from 2012 to 2015, and as the Governor of Gaziantep from 2015 to 2018.

Early life and career
Yerlikaya graduated from Istanbul University Faculty of Political Science in 1989, with a degree in Public Administration. He began work at the Ministry of the Interior as a candidate to become a Kaymakam (a district governor) in 1990. He served as the Kaymakam for the districts of Felahiye, Erzin, Derabucak, Hilvan and Sarıkaya during his early bureaucratic career.

Yerlikaya also served as a legal advisor to the Interior Ministry and Chief of Staff at the Ministry of Health. He was also an executive board member of the Turkish Heavy Industry and Service Sector Public Employers' Union (TÜHİS).

Governorships
On 30 November 2007, Yerlikaya was made Governor of Şırnak. Serving until 13 May 2010, he was appointed as the Governor of Ağrı on the same day, serving until 3 August 2012. On 3 August 2012, he was appointed Governor of Tekirdağ until 19 February 2015, on which day he became Governor of Gaziantep. He served until 26 October 2018, upon which he became Governor of Istanbul, which is his current role.

Acting Mayor of Istanbul
Turkey held routine local elections on 31 March 2019. During the mayoral vote in Istanbul, the opposition Nation Alliance candidate Ekrem İmamoğlu won a surprise victory, edging past government-backed People's Alliance candidate Binali Yıldırım by a narrow 0.2% margin. The government subsequently appealed to the Supreme Electoral Council of Turkey (YSK) for a recount. After several complaints and recounts, İmamoğlu was eventually sworn in as Mayor on 18 April 2019. The YSK, however, accepted a complaint by the People's Alliance for an annulment of the elections on 6 May, thus removing İmamoğlu from his office as Mayor and scheduling fresh elections for 23 June 2019.

As customary when a political position is in doubt, the Ministry of the Interior appointed the city's incumbent governor, namely Yerlikaya, as acting Mayor of Istanbul until the vacancy could be filled by the re-run vote. Yerlikaya, as acting mayor, was criticised for taking decisions that were viewed by the opposition as beyond the remit of a placeholder. He was also criticised for supposedly turning a blind eye to pro-Yıldırım posters and campaigns being conducted by municipal workers, who are required to remain neutral.

İmamoğlu won the re-run with a substantially increased majority, thereby taking over from Yerlikaya.

Controversies

Comments about ISIL 
While serving as Governor of Gaziantep, Yerlikaya made a series of gaffes during statements about captured militants from the Islamic State of Iraq and the Levant (ISIL). On one occasion, he referred to an ISIL militant on trial in a formal manner, using the formal suffix 'bey' after his name (which he also repeated incorrectly). His comments were criticised for supposedly showing ISIL militants respect. Yerlikaya responded by claiming that he had been misunderstood and that the suspected militant was innocent until proven guilty in court.

On another occasion, he was criticised for commenting on an ISIL suicide bomber in an apparently supportive manner after the bomber had allegedly surrendered to the police. He again rejected criticism, saying instead that his supportive words had been directed to the police operation.

Banning of Kurdish theatrical play "Beru" in Istanbul 
While serving as governor of Istanbul, shortly before being its first performance. It had been performed three years prior both in Turkey and also abroad without issue.

Personal life
Yerlikaya is married and has four children.

References

Mayors of Istanbul
Living people
Istanbul University alumni
Governors of Istanbul
Governors of Şırnak
Governors of Ağrı
People from Konya
1968 births